Maret Ani (born 31 January 1982) is a retired tennis player from Estonia.

At the start of 2006, she was the top-ranked player in Estonia, before losing that spot to Kaia Kanepi.

Ani was a junior basketball champion, but devoted herself to tennis from the age of 14. She moved to Italy three years later, after finding sponsorship for coaching. She was coached initially by Aita Põldma and later by Pierfrancesco Restelli.

Ani first played for the Estonia Fed Cup team in 1998.

WTA career finals

Doubles: 2 runner-ups

ITF Circuit finals

Singles (7–14)

Doubles (17–15)

References

External links

 
 
 

1982 births
Living people
Sportspeople from Tallinn
Estonian female tennis players
Olympic tennis players of Estonia
Tennis players at the 2004 Summer Olympics
Tennis players at the 2008 Summer Olympics